The Syracuse Triad is the name given to the three women's sororities founded at Syracuse University in the USA. Alpha Phi was founded in 1872 by 10 of the original 20 women admitted into the university. Gamma Phi Beta was founded in 1874 and with it came the term "sorority", which was coined at the time of its founding. (Prior to that, women's Greek-letter organizations used the term "women's fraternity", since no more appropriate term existed.) Alpha Gamma Delta completed the triad in 1904.

The three sororities maintain a special bond. A special Syracuse Triad ceremony or event is held on most campuses where all three groups are present. An example of common events are a Triad Tea or a Triad Dance.

Syracuse Triad at universities
Here is a partial list of campuses in which all three members of the Triad are currently present:
Bowling Green State University
Cal Poly San Luis Obispo
California State University, Chico
Chapman University
Duquesne University
Florida State University
Indiana University
Iowa State University
Lehigh University
Miami University
Ohio State University
Purdue University
San Diego State University
Syracuse University
University of Alabama
University of British Columbia
University of California, Los Angeles
University of Central Missouri
University of Georgia
University of Idaho
University of Illinois at Urbana-Champaign
University of Kentucky
University of Michigan
University of Minnesota
University of Oklahoma
University of Southern California  
University of Toronto
University of Washington
Virginia Tech
Washington State University

See also
Fraternities and sororities

References

External links
Margaret Knights Hultsch, "The Syracuse Triad", Alpha Gamma Delta magazine. Knights Hultsch is a former editor of Alpha Phi Quarterly,

National Panhellenic Conference
Syracuse University
Alpha Gamma Delta